Godwin is a town in Cumberland County, North Carolina, United States. The population was 139 at the 2010 census.

History
Godwin was named after Isaac William Godwin, a pioneer settler.

Geography
U.S. Route 301 (Dunn Road) passes through the town, leading northeast  to Dunn and southwest  to Fayetteville, the county seat. North Carolina Highway 82 intersects US 301 in Godwin and leads north  to Erwin and southeast  to Interstate 95 at Exit 65.

Demographics

As of the census of 2000, there were 112 people, 38 households, and 31 families residing in the town. The population density was 450.2 people per square mile (173.0/km2). There were 43 housing units at an average density of 172.8 per square mile (66.4/km2). The racial makeup of the town was 73.21% White, 13.39% African American, 4.46% Native American, 2.68% from other races, and 6.25% from two or more races. Hispanic or Latino of any race were 13.39% of the population.

There were 38 households, out of which 34.2% had children under the age of 18 living with them, 57.9% were married couples living together, 10.5% had a female householder with no husband present, and 18.4% were non-families. 15.8% of all households were made up of individuals, and 13.2% had someone living alone who was 65 years of age or older. The average household size was 2.95 and the average family size was 3.19.

In the town, the population was spread out, with 32.1% under the age of 18, 8.0% from 18 to 24, 26.8% from 25 to 44, 18.8% from 45 to 64, and 14.3% who were 65 years of age or older. The median age was 31 years. For every 100 females, there were 89.8 males. For every 100 females age 18 and over, there were 85.4 males.

The median income for a household in the town was $41,250, and the median income for a family was $42,083. Males had a median income of $25,417 versus $22,188 for females. The per capita income for the town was $14,943. There were 8.6% of families and 13.0% of the population living below the poverty line, including 34.4% of under eighteens and 18.8% of those over 64.

Places of worship
Godwin Presbyterian Church was organized in May 1904 as an offshoot of the Old Bluff Church in Wade, North Carolina. It developed from a Sabbath School (Sunday School) that had begun in 1889. The first church structure had a seating capacity of 200 and was used for 30 years before it burned in 1934. While a new building was constructed, the Presbyterian congregation was invited by the Godwin Baptist church to share their facility. The new facility was completed in 1937. The Godwin Presbyterian Church holds an annual homecoming each October. The grounds of the church feature a friendship garden open to all.

Notable people
David Marshall (Carbine) Williams, firearms designer.
Paul Valandra, former politician, served for South Dakota House of Representatives.
Dennis Smith Jr., basketball player, ninth player selected in 2017 NBA draft; born in Godwin. 
Russell Davis, former NFL player, Super Bowl champion.
Luis Fonseca, United States Navy sailor.
Richard Holmes, former Canadian Football League player.

References

Towns in Cumberland County, North Carolina
Towns in North Carolina
Fayetteville, North Carolina metropolitan area